December is the twelfth and the final month of the year.

December may also refer to:

December (Roman month), the tenth month of the Roman calendar

Books
December (magazine), an art, prose, and poetry journal founded in 1958
"December", a 1994 poem by Patti Smith from Early Work
December, a mystery novel by Phil Rickman, 2011
December (comics), a mutant character created by Marvel Comics
December, by Eve Bunting David Diaz (illustrator), 1997
December, by Elizabeth Hartley Winthrop, 2008

Film and television
December (1988 film), an Indian Malayalam-language film
December (1991 film), a film starring Will Wheaton
December (2008 film), a Brazilian drama
December (2022 film), a Russian period crime thriller

Music
December (musical duo), a South Korean musical duo
"December", art song by Charles Ives (1874-1954)
 "December", a song by Kira Kosarin

Albums
December (Chris Botti album) (2002)
December (George Winston album) (1982)
December (Kenny Loggins album) (1998)
December (The Moody Blues album) (2003)

EPs
 December (Gabrielle Aplin and Hannah Grace EP) (2018)
 December (Reigan Derry EP) (2015)

Songs
"December" (Collective Soul song)
"December" (Måns Zelmerlöw song)
"December" (The Waterboys song)
"December" by Adam Lambert, from the album Take One
"December" by Ariana Grande, from the album Christmas & Chill (2015)
"December" by Assemblage 23, from the album Endure (2016)
"December" by Kenny Loggins, from the album December (1998)
"December" by Neck Deep, from the album Life's Not out to Get You (2015)
"December" by Pride & Fall, from the album Nephesh (2003)
"December" by Sara Bareilles, from the album The Blessed Unrest (2013)
"December" by Static-X, from the album Wisconsin Death Trip (1999)
"December" by Unwound, from the album Leaves Turn Inside You (2001)
"December" by Weezer, from the album Maladroit (2002)
"December" by Earth, Wind & Fire, from the album Holiday (2014)